Christina Pedersen may refer to:

 Christina Pedersen (handballer) (born 1982), Danish handballer
 Christina Pedersen (referee) (born 1981), Norwegian football referee

See also
 Christinna Pedersen (born 1986), Danish badminton player
 Christina Petersen (born 1974), Danish footballer
 Christian Pedersen (disambiguation)